Tân Châu may refer to several places in Vietnam:

Tân Châu, An Giang, a district-level town of An Giang Province
Tân Châu District, Tây Ninh, a rural district of Tây Ninh Province
Tân Châu, Tây Ninh, a township and capital of Tân Châu District, Tây Ninh Province
Tân Châu, Lâm Đồng, a commune of Di Linh District
Tân Châu, Hưng Yên, a commune of Khoái Châu District